is a city located in Ehime Prefecture, Japan. , the city had an estimated population of 70,440 in 35429 households and a population density of 150 persons per km².

Geography
Uwajima is located in southwestern Ehime Prefecture, facing  the wide rias coastline and remote islands, Uwa Bay on the Seto Inland Sea to the east, and with the other three sides surrounded by mountains. Although it is actually located to the south-southeast  of Yawatahama, as it is the terminus of the limited express train on the JR Shikoku Yosan Line, people other than local residents tend to think that it is the westernmost city in Ehime Prefecture.

Neighbouring municipalities 
Ehime Prefecture
Seiyo
Kihoku
Matsuno
Kōchi Prefecture
 Shimanto city
 Sukumo

Climate
Uwajima has a humid subtropical climate (Köppen climate classification Cfa) with hot summers and cool winters. Precipitation is significant throughout the year, but is highest from June to September.

Demographics
Per Japanese census data, the population of Uwajima has been decreased steadily since the 1960s.

History 
The area of Uwajima was part of ancient Iyo Province. During the Heian period, Uwajima (notably the island of Hiburijima in Uwajima Bay) was center of piracy in the Seto Inland Sea and became the stronghold of Fujiwara no Sumitomo in his rebellion. During the Muromachi period, a branch of the Saionji family was appointed as governor of the area by the Ashikaga shogunate, but was constantly being invaded his more powerful and aggressive neighbors, including Ouchi Yoshitaka, Mōri Motonari, Ōtomo Sōrin,  the Tosa-Ichijo clan and the Chōsokabe clan. The Saionji survived by the fluid loyalties and fierce resistance, but were eventually overcome by Chōsokabe Motochika, who was in turn overthrown by the forces of Toyotomi Hideyoshi. Iyo Province was given to Kobayakawa Takakage, who assigned the area around Uwajima to his adopted son and half-brother, Hidekane. Takakage was later transferred to Kyushu and was replaced by Hideyoshi's general Toda Katsutaka. In contrast the Kobayakawa, the Toda ruled with extreme harshness, murdering the descendants of the Saiōnji family and thinking nothing of robbery, rape and murder of the local inhabitants. When ordered to send troops to the invasion of Korea in 1592, he cut down large trees in shrines and temples throughout his domain to construct ships. He went insane during the campaign, and died in Korea without heir. Hideyoshi then assigned Tōdō Takatora to the domain. A noted castle designer, Takatora spent six years building Itajima Castle, which would later be called Uwajima Castle. Following the Battle of Sekigahara and other campaigns, he was promoted to Tsu Domain in Ise Province. In 1614, Date Hidemune, the illegitimate eldest son of Date Masamune , was awarded the 100,000 koku Uwajima Domain by Shogun Tokugawa Hidetada, and moved into Uwajima Castle the following year. His descendants would rule the domain until the Meiji restoration.

Following the Meiji restoration, the town of Uwajima was created with the establishment of the modern municipalities system. In 1917, Maruho Village was merged into Uwajima. The town of Uwajima merged with the village of Yahata on August 1, 1921 and was raised to city status. The city was extended by combining Kushima Village in 1934 and renovating the bay area for factory usage. The center of the city was largely destroyed by bombing during World War II in 1945; however, post-war reconstruction was rapid. In 1955, Uwajima annexed Miura and Takamitsu Villages  and Uwaumi village in 1974. On August 1, 2005 Uwajima absorbed the towns of Mima, Tsushima and Yoshida (all from Kitauwa District) .

Government
Uwajima has a mayor-council form of government with a directly elected mayor and a unicameral city council of 24 members. Uwajima, together with Kihoku and Matsuno, contributes four members to the Ehime Prefectural Assembly. In terms of national politics, the town is part of Ehime 4th district  of the lower house of the Diet of Japan.

Economy
Uwajima is the largest municipality of southwestern, but industry is poorly developed except for a single shipyard. Commercial fishing, taking advantage of the ria coastline, aquaculture and cultured pearls is the mainstay of the local economy.

Education
Uwajima has 30 public elementary schools and six public middle schools operated by the city government. The city has five public high schools operated by the Ehime Prefectural Board of Education.

Transportation

Railways 
 Shikoku Railway Company - Yosan Line
  -  -  -  - 
 Shikoku Railway Company - Yodo Line
   -  -  -  -  -

Highways 
  Matsuyama Expressway

Ports
Port of Uwajima

Local attractions

Uwajima Castle is well known as one of the 12 Japanese castles to have an original donjon built in the Edo Period.
Date Family Museum which features many historically important objects tied to the history of the region and the Daimyō family Date which ruled this area.
Taga Shrine, a fertility shrine which features a large, realistic phallus carved from a log approximately 9 feet in length, 1 foot in diameter. Next to the shrine is a graphic sex museum, filled with artifacts and paintings from around the world.
Uwajima Ushi-oni Festival, also known as  "Gaiya Festival," or the "Warei Shrine Festival." Held in July, among the festivities are ushioni teams parading down the street, a dance contest to the town song known as the "Gaiya" dance, traditional dancing, and a bullfight. The word "Gaiya" is in a local dialect, approximately translating to "awesome" in English.The city is known for bullfighting, which differs from the more widely known Spanish bullfights in that there is no matador. Two bulls fight in a ring until one bull's knees touch the ground or flees, marking it the loser. Bullfights are generally held in January, April, July, and August.
Ryūkō-ji, 41st temple on the Shikoku Pilgrimage
Butsumoku-ji, 42nd temple on the Shikoku Pilgrimage

Tsushima
Tsushima occupies an area of approximately 200 km2 and has a significant proportion of Uwajima's current land area, despite not being highly populated (fewer than 15,000 people).  It's made up of small villages that shared a municipal government as Tsushima until they were amalgamated into Uwajima.

Tsushima is known for the Iwamatsu River and its annual festival where people eat tiny, live fish, as well as pearl and fish farming. It is part of the prefecture's mikan industry.

Notable people from Uwajima, Ehime
 Umetaro Azechi, Japanese printmaker and mountain climber
 Masafumi Hirai, Japanese professional baseball pitcher
 Tadashi Irie, yakuza, the head (kumicho) of the Osaka-based 2nd Takumi-gumi and the grand general manager (so-honbucho) of the 6th Yamaguchi-gumi 
 Kazuyoshi Ishii, Japanese master of Seidokaikan karate and founder of the K-1 fighting circuit
 Daisuke Itō, Japanese film director and screenwriter 
 Akinori Iwamura, Japanese baseball manager and former baseball infielder
 Kenta Kawai, Japanese former football player
 Susumu Koshimizu, Japanese sculptor, installation artist and member of Mono-ha
 Shingo Matsumoto, Japanese amateur Greco-Roman wrestler
 Ryuji Miyade, former Nippon Professional Baseball outfielder
 Shinro Ohtake, Japanese artist (born in Tokyo, Japan but raised in Uwajima, Ehime)
 Masayoshi Ōishi, Japanese musician and singer-songwriter 
 Tetchō Suehiro, Japanese politician, novelist, and journalist
 Mutsumi Tamabayashi, Japanese football player (Ehime FC, J2 League)
 Sho Tanaka, Japanese professional wrestler
 Raymond Ken'ichi Tanaka, Bishop of the Roman Catholic Diocese of Kyoto (1976–1997)
 Koichi Yamamoto, Japanese politician, member of Liberal Democratic Party and member of the House of Representatives in the Diet (national legislature)
 Haruhiro Yamashita, Japanese gymnast and 2x Olympic gold medalist (1964 Summer Olympics)
Kyoichi Katayama, the author of the novel Socrates in Love, is from Uwajima. The novel was turned into a movie.
Shinro Ohtake, a contemporary Japanese artist, has lived and worked in Uwajima since 1987.

Gallery

References

External links

 Uwajima City official website 
 Nanrakuen Website 
 Ehime Tourism Information: Uwajima
 

 
Cities in Ehime Prefecture
Port settlements in Japan
Populated coastal places in Japan